Veria may refer to:

Veria, a town in northern Greece, also known as Veroia and (in classical antiquity) Beroea
Veria, Laconia, a village in the municipality Oinountas, Laconia, Greece
Véria, Jura, a commune in eastern France
Beroea, the ancient Greek name for Aleppo, Syria
Veria Living, a former name for the television network Z Living